The 1934 WANFL season was the 50th season of the various incarnations of the Western Australian National Football League. Following upon numerous unsuccessful attempts to revive Midland Junction during the 1920s, Bassendean-based  were admitted to the competition. The black and whites were more competitive than previous new clubs owing to the presence of a number of players with previous WANFL experience, including Fred Sweetapple from West Perth, captain-coach "Judda" Bee from East Fremantle and Nigel Gorn from South Fremantle, but after five promising campaigns were to endure nineteen open-age seasons without once winning as many matches as they lost.

Because Parliament failed to pass an Act to allow the club to acquire Raphael Park, however, Perth reverted to their old name two seasons later. Subiaco, after a stirring run to the 1933 Grand Final, fell to their worst season since 1922 due to the loss of Westy Gilbert and major injuries to Bill Brophy, Bill Bant, Lloyd Strack, Norm Stehn, Les Mills and Syd Briggs, whilst West Perth under the coaching of ex-Maroon Johnny Leonard were to win a second flag in three seasons over East Fremantle. Old Easts won a seventh successive minor premiership but gave a surprisingly poor display in the Grand Final.

The 1934 season is most famous, however, for the unprecedented goalkicking success, despite some exceptionally wet Saturdays, of spearheads George Doig and Ted Tyson, both of whom completely smashed previous WANFL goalkicking records. In the end, despite neither achieving much on a windy day in the Grand Final, Doig finished with 152 goals and Tyson with 143, tallies not bettered until Bernie Naylor did so in the early 1950s.

Clubs

Home-and-away season

Round 1

Round 2 (Labour Day)

Round 3

Round 4

Round 5

Round 6

Round 7 (Foundation Day)

Round 8

Round 9

Round 10

Round 11

Round 12

First interstate match

Second interstate match

Round 13

Round 14

Round 15

Round 16

Round 17

Round 18

Round 19

Round 20

Round 21

Ladder

Finals

First semi-final

Second semi-final

Preliminary final

Grand Final

Notes
The nearest comparable feat would be 's six straight minor premierships between 1955 and 1960 or Port Adelaide's six minor premierships with a combined total of ten minor round losses between 1909 and 1915.Equalled by George Moloney in 1940 and Naylor in 1952.

References

External links
Official WAFL website
Western Australian National Football League (WANFL) Season 1934

West Australian Football League seasons
WANFL season